S-CHIP may refer to:
 State Children's Health Insurance Program
 S-Chips, Chinese companies listed on the Singapore Exchange